Fukumi (written: 福見 or 福美) is both a Japanese surname and a feminine Japanese given name. Notable people with the name include:

, Japanese judoka
, Japanese actress
, Japanese textile artist

Japanese feminine given names
Japanese-language surnames